The Little Cold River is a  stream in western Maine in the United States, flowing through the foothills of the White Mountains. It is a tributary of the Cold River, part of the Saco River watershed.

The river begins in Chatham, New Hampshire, at the junction of McDonough Brook and Watson Brook. Flowing east, the river enters Maine after only one-half mile. Turning more southeast, the river passes the village of Stow, reaching the Cold River one mile upstream from the latter river's end at Charles Pond in Fryeburg.

See also

List of rivers of New Hampshire

References

Rivers of Maine
Rivers of New Hampshire
Saco River
Rivers of Oxford County, Maine
Rivers of Carroll County, New Hampshire